Saygachny is a rural locality (a settlement) in Astrakhansky Selsoviet, Narimanovsky District, Astrakhan Oblast, Russia. The population was 196 as of 2010. There are 2 streets.

Geography 
Saygachny is located 146 km southwest of Narimanov (the district's administrative centre) by road. Drofiny is the nearest rural locality.

References 

Rural localities in Narimanovsky District